Thaxteriella is a genus in the Tubeufiaceae family of fungi.

References

External links
Thaxteriella at Index Fungorum

Tubeufiaceae
Dothideomycetes genera